Open Theology is a peer-reviewed open access academic journal published by De Gruyter since 2015. It covers theology and religious studies. The editor-in-chief  is Charles Taliaferro (St. Olaf College).

Abstracting and indexing
The journal is abstracted and indexed in EBSCO databases, Emerging Sources Citation Index, ERIH PLUS, and Scopus.

References

External links

Open access journals
Religious studies journals
Publications established in 2015
De Gruyter academic journals
English-language journals